Alex Cullen (born 28 November 1980) is an Australian journalist and TV presenter

Cullen is currently sport presenter of Nine Network's breakfast program Today.

Early life
Cullen was born in Dubbo, New South Wales, and grew up on a farm in Coonamble, he attended Coonamble High School, and then Saint Ignatius' College, Riverview, before going on to complete a Bachelor of Communications - Journalism degree at Charles Sturt University.

Career
In early 2003, Cullen began working as a reporter for Prime News in Wagga Wagga. He then moved to Western Australia becoming a reporter for Golden West News in Kalgoorlie and then Bunbury, where he also became GWN7's sports presenter. He then began working for Seven News in Perth in 2006, before moving to be a sports producer on Sunrise in 2007. Six months later, Cullen returned to the screen as a general reporter for Seven News in Sydney.

Cullen was appointed weekend sports presenter in late 2007, before becoming weeknight sports presenter in January 2009 after Matt White left the position to host Today Tonight.

In addition to working with Seven Network, Cullen has worked for ABC Local Radio, 2BS, B-Rock FM and 2GB.

In April 2010, Cullen was promoted to reporter of Seven's Sunday Night public affairs program, with Tony Squires replacing him as weeknight sport presenter on Seven News Sydney.

In November 2019, it was announced that Cullen would join the Nine Network after the Seven Network axed Sunday Night. It was later announced that Alex would join the Nine Network and would fill in on Today over the summer period.

In December 2019, the Nine Network announced that Cullen would join Today as sport presenter from January 2020 replacing Tony Jones.

In March 2020, Cullen replaced Tracy Vo as news presenter, as Vo returned to Perth due to the COVID-19 pandemic.

In January 2023, Brooke Boney replaced Cullen as news presenter on Today taking on news and entertainment with Alex focusing on sport.

Personal life
In April 2017, Cullen married Bonnie Campbell at a property in Wallalong, Hunter Valley.

In January 2019, Cullen's wife gave birth to twin girls.

In February 2021, Cullen announced that wife Bonnie is expecting their third child in August. They had a son born on 16 August. 

Cullen is openly a republican, supporting Australia replacing its Constitutional Monarchy for a Republican alternative.

References

External links
 

Australian television journalists
Nine News presenters
Living people
1980 births